The Fright Night franchise consists of American vampire horror-comedy films, including three theatrical releases with an original movie, its sequel and a remake, followed by one straight-to-home video sequel to the remake. Based on an original story by writer-director Tom Holland, the overall plot of each installment follows an adolescent hero who determines that his next door neighbor is a real-life vampire and his pursuits in defeating the monster.

The original film was met with positive financial and critical reception. Conversely its sequel lost money for the studio, and was met with negative response from critics. Despite this, it has found some welcoming retrospective praise in later years. The 2011 remake movie was deemed a critical and box office success. In modern-day analysis, film critics have deemed the film to be one of the best horror remakes of all-time, with some arguing that its a better movie than the original. The film's respective sequel was met with overwhelming negative reception from film critics, and earned little income from video rentals.

The franchise will continue with a legacy-sequel to the 1985 movie, currently in development.

Film

Fright Night (1985)

Charley Brewster, a teenage fan of a weekly television series titled Fright Night who is an avid horror enthusiast, begins to question the intentions of the neighbor who recently moved into the neighborhood named Jerry Dandrige, and his roommate Billy Cole. After a number of occurrences, Charley begins to suspect that Jerry may actually be a vampire. When a series of suspicious homicides involving women are brought to light, Charley is convinced that Jerry is responsible. After attempts to inform the police prove unsuccessful, Charley, his girlfriend Amy, and his friend Edward "Evil Ed" Thompson seek the help of has-been host of his favorite television program, Peter Vincent. Though Peter is initially skeptical, he begins to realize there is more to Charley's suspicions than everyone realizes. Together the team looks for a way to kill the vampire living next door.

Fright Night Part 2 (1989)

After three years of overcoming his trauma from the events that transpired with his vampiric neighbor, Charley Brewster realizes that the incident is improbable. The now twenty-year-old survivor attends numerous counseling sessions, where his counselor is convinced that the undead monsters he came in contact with years before were merely figments of his overactive imagination. As a part of his therapy, he avoids contact with Peter Vincent who had helped him slay the vampires. When several new residents move into the neighborhood, including the seductive actress named Regine Dandrige, Charley begins to question their intentions. Charley realizes that she is Jerry's sister, as she begins to take unusual interest in Charley, his new girlfriend Alex, and Peter. The team come to the conclusion that she is a vampire seeking revenge for the destruction of her undead brother. Haunted by the past, and hunted by a monster, Charley must overcome his fears to once again defeat the monsters that feast on the civilians of his town.

Fright Night (2011)

Charley Brewster, a teenage senior in high school who's dating the most popular girl at school named Amy, is enjoying his school year. This changes however, when Jerry Dandrige moves in next door. Jerry is charismatic and becomes a person of interest, when Charley witnesses some unusual activity going on next door. After a series of events, Charley becomes convinced that his new neighbor is a vampire. Though he shares his theory with others, no one believes him. Together with his girlfriend, he seeks the help of an illusionist and expert of the supernatural named Peter Vincent. As a team, they set out to kill the monster that is plaguing their neighborhood, before he overtakes them all.

Fright Night 2: New Blood (2013)

Some time after their near-death experiences while encountering Jerry Dandrige, Charley Brewster attends a college in Romania as a foreign exchange student, alongside his friend "Evil" Ed and his ex-girlfriend Amy. Following a series of events, he begins to suspect that his seductive art professor Gerri Dandrige may also be undead. As he begins to investigate his suspicions further he discovers that she is actually the ancient Elizabeth Báthory, a vampire who seeks to complete a pagan ritual with the blood of a "new moon virgin" and that she plans to do so with Amy. Though their relationship didn't last, Charley still loves Amy, and is determined to stop the sacrifice from happening. As things seem to be hopeless he turns once again to the person that helped him defeat Jerry, the vampire hunter Peter Vincent. Together they race against time, to stop the monsters from completing their scheme which will turn them all into creatures of the night.

Potential future
In October 2020, Tom Holland announced that a legacy sequel to the original film which largely ignores the events of Part 2, was in development. Holland stated that he is working on a script that is tentatively titled, Fright Night: Resurrection. The project will largely, retcon the events of the 1988 sequel. Though the filmmaker would not reveal many of the story details, he stated that the plot involves original characters: Charlie Brewster, Edward "Evil Ed" Thompson, Jerry Dandrige, and Billy Cole.

Main cast and characters

Additional crew and production details

Reception

Box office and financial performance

Critical and public response

Stage

The official stage adaptation made its debut at the Carnegie Stage in Pittsburgh, Pennsylvania, on October 5, 2018. Directed by Erynn Dalton, with a stage-play written by James Michael Shoberg, the production was a joint-venture production between Rage of the Stage Players, and Infinite Abyss studios. Dan Finkel, Elena Cristina Lázaro, Greg Crawford, Corey Shaffer, Brian Ceponis, and Ryan Ott featured in the primary cast: Charley Brewster, Amy Petersen, Peter Vincent, Edward "Evil Ed" Thompson, Jerry Dandrige, and Billy Cole, respectively. The plot closely followed that of the original film, while adding additional content and plot devices.

The play was well received by critics with praise directed at its cast, the script, its use of nostalgic undertones, the cast's performance, the production quality including costumes and set design, the integration of horror-campiness, the suspenseful story, and the interactive nature of the play. Criticism was directed at its pacing.

In other media

 Literary releases

 Novelizations:
 Fright Night (1985): Published by Tor Books and developed to release as a novelization to coincide with the feature film debut, in 1985. The book was co-written by Craig Spector and John Skipp, after the authors received a copy of the script. Though the plot follows the movie closely, there are additional scenes in its pages that explore character releations.
 Fright Night: Origins (2022): An adaptation and expansion of the original film, published by Holland House and Encyclopocalypse Publications. The novel expands on the source material, and is co-written by franchise creator Tom Holland, alongside A. Jack Ulrich. The plot is stated to include greater detail and convey ideas that Holland had to cut previously due to time constraints on the movie. Holland stated that, the book is "intend to take the Fright Night universe far beyond the story the films have told". The book was released on September 6, 2022.
 Comic book series: A series of 27 comic book literary releases, published by NOW Comics and released from 1988-1993, the standalone series of comic books released Fright Night Part 2 as a graphic novel. After its release, the continuing series centered around the further adventures of Peter Vincent and Charley Brewster, who team up to fight an array of monsters. In the final issues, Jerry Dandrige was brought back from the dead and featured in a story-arc where he accumulates an army of French vampire wives. The comics were abruptly cancelled when the company filed for bankruptcy.

 Video game Fright Night: The Arcade Game (1988): Developed and published by MicroDeal Ltd., exclusively for the Amiga personal computers, the premise was based on the original film. The arcade game's gameplay featured players taking on the role of Jerry Dandrige, while attempting to turn victims into vampires. The game was met with mixed critical reception, with praise directed at its graphics and criticism at its restrictive gameplay.

Notes

References 

 
Film franchises introduced in 1985